The women's 10 kilometres walk event at the 1999 Summer Universiade was held in Palma de Mallorca, Spain on 10 July.

Results

References

Athletics at the 1999 Summer Universiade
1999 in women's athletics
1999